Arbelodes varii is a moth in the family Cossidae. It is found in South Africa, where it has been recorded from the Western Cape Province.

References

Natural History Museum Lepidoptera generic names catalog

Endemic moths of South Africa
Moths described in 2010
Metarbelinae